Love Letters  is the first Japanese studio album by Korean boy group The Boss, released on January 18, 2012 on the Japanese label Sony Music Entertainment.

Background and release
This full album follows the group's previous Japanese singles in the "Love Series", being another title using the word "Love". The previously released singles “Love Power”, “Love Bingo!”, “Love Parade” and the more recent “Love Days”, were included in the album’s track list.

Album information
The album was released in three different versions, including a regular edition, limited edition A and limited edition B. While the limited edition A comes with a 60-page photobook, a CD including the same 12-song track list as the regular edition, as well as a DVD including the "Documentary of Daikokudanji: First Story", the limited edition B only includes eight tracks.

Track listing

Regular edition / Limited edition A CD

Limited edition B CD

Limited edition A DVD

Chart performance

Release history

References

External links
大国男児 | Sony Music 
The Boss official website 

2012 albums
Japanese-language albums
Sony Music Entertainment Japan albums
The Boss (band) albums